Jatir Janak Bangabandhu Sheikh Mujibur Rahman Govt. College, Dhaka is a college situated near Airport Road at Dhaka in Bangladesh. It was established in 2013. It is a 6-storey building. The playground is available for playing and for festivals. The college was opened on 7 August 2014 with 580 students. The college has a total number of 900 seats for students. The government operates it officially.

Students 
In this college, there are approximately 1814 students.

References

External links 
 Official Webpage

Educational institutions established in 2013
Colleges in Dhaka District
2013 establishments in Bangladesh